The 2004 Tandridge District Council election took place on 10 June 2004 to elect members of Tandridge District Council in Surrey, England. One third of the council was up for election and the Conservative Party stayed in overall control of the council.

After the election, the composition of the council was:
Conservative: 28
Liberal Democrat: 11
Labour: 2
Independent: 1

Election result
Overall turnout at the election was 46.25%.

Ward results

By-elections between 2004 and 2006

Chaldon

Limpsfield

References

2004
2004 English local elections
2000s in Surrey